A comma-free code is block code in which no concatenation of two code words contains a valid code word that overlaps both.

Comma-free codes are also known as self-synchronizing block codes because no synchronization is required to find the beginning of a code word.

References

External links 
 

Coding theory